The Christavia Mk I is a Canadian two-seats in tandem homebuilt aircraft designed by Ron Mason. The aircraft is supplied in the form of plans for amateur construction. Designed for missionary flying in Africa, the aircraft's name means "Christ-in-Aviation". The Christavia Mk II is a side-by-side configuration version.

The Christavia Mk I was first completed and registered as a Christavia CA-05 with Transport Canada on October 1, 1981 and first flew in 1982. Over 350 had been completed and flown by 2002.

Design and development
The Christavia is a single engine, high wing, conventional landing gear-equipped aircraft. The fuselage is of 4130 steel tube construction. The wings are flapless, predominantly wooden, use a custom Mason airfoil design and are supported by dual wing struts. The exterior is finished with aircraft fabric covering.

Plans are marketed by Aircraft Spruce & Specialty Co. Ron Mason sold the rights to the Christavia series of aircraft to Aircraft Spruce and no longer supplies the plans or support.

The designer estimated the construction time as 2000 hours.

Operational history

In January 2016 forty-two examples of the Christavia series of aircraft were registered with Transport Canada and sixty-one in the United States with the FAA.

Variants
Christavia Mk I
Two seat seats in tandem model.
Christavia Mk II
Two seat side-by-side model, with otherwise similar specifications to the Mk I.
Christavia Mk IV
Four place model with  engine recommended.

Specifications (Christavia Mk I)

See also

References

External links

Christavia Mk I
Homebuilt aircraft
1980s Canadian sport aircraft
1980s Canadian civil utility aircraft
Single-engined tractor aircraft
High-wing aircraft
Aircraft first flown in 1982